The swimming competition at the 11th Arab Games was held November 12–18, 2007 in Cairo, Egypt. The competition featured 40 events (20 for males, 20 for females) swum in a long course (50 m) pool.

Participating nations
Nations with swimmers at the 2007 Arab Games were:

 Libya

Event Schedule
Prelims and finals held in all events, save the 800 and 1500 freestyles and the relays, with the male event preceding the female event.

Results

Men

Women

References

Events at the 2007 Pan Arab Games
Pan Arab Games
2007